The following is a list of Chinese wars and battles, organized by date.

Ancient China

Imperial China

Qin dynasty (221–206 BCE)

Han dynasty (206 BCE – 220 CE)

Chu-Han Contention (206–202 BCE)

Western Han (206 BCE – 9 CE)

Xin dynasty (9–23 CE) and early Eastern Han (25–36 CE)

Eastern Han – middle period (36–184)

End of the Han dynasty (184–220)

Three Kingdoms period (220–280)

Jin dynasty (265–420), the Southern Dynasties (420–587), the Sixteen Kingdoms (304–439) and the Northern Dynasties (386–581)

Sui dynasty (581–618)

Tang dynasty (618–907)

Five Dynasties and Ten Kingdoms Period (907–960)

Song dynasty (960–1279)

Liao dynasty (907–1125)

Jurchen Jin dynasty (1115–1234)

Yuan dynasty (1271–1368)

Ming dynasty (1368–1644)

Qing dynasty (1644–1912)

Modern China

Yuan Shikai-led Republic of China
Bai Lang Rebellion (1911-1913)
Second Chinese Revolution (1913)
World War I (1914-1918)
National Protection War (1915-1916)

Warlord Era
Manchu Restoration (1917)
Kuomintang pacification of Qinghai (1917-1949)
Battle of Xiahe (1929)
Occupation of Mongolia (1919-1921)
Zhili–Anhui War (1920)
Guangdong–Guangxi War (1920-1922)
Spirit Soldier rebellions (1920–1926)
Mongolian Revolution (1921)
First Zhili–Fengtian War (1922)
Second Zhili–Fengtian War (1924)
Anti-Fengtian War (1925)
Yunnan–Guangxi War (1925-1927)
Northern Expedition (1926–1928)
April 12 Incident (1927)
Muslim conflict in Gansu (1927–1930)
Red Spears' uprising in Shandong (1928–1929)
Warlord Rebellion in northeastern Shandong
Central Plains War (1929-1930)
Chiang-Gui War (1929)

Nationalist government during the Nanjing decade (1927-1937)
Sino-Soviet conflict (1929)
Sino-Tibetan War (1930–1932)
Qinghai–Tibet War (1932)
Kirghiz rebellion (1932)
Han–Liu War (1932)
Kumul Rebellion (1930–1934)
Kizil massacre (1933)
Battle of Aksu (1933)
Battle of Sekes Tash (1933)
Battle of Kashgar (1933)
First Battle of Urumqi (1933)
Battle of Toksun (1933)
Second Battle of Urumqi (1934)
Battle of Kashgar (1934)
Battle of Yangi Hissar (1934)
Battle of Yarkand (1934)
Charkhlik Revolt (1934)
Fujian Rebellion (1933–34)
Soviet invasion of Xinjiang (1934)
Battle of Tutung
Battle of Dawan Cheng
War in Ningxia (1934)
Charkhlik revolt (1935)
Xinjiang War (1937)

Chinese Civil War (First phase, 1927–1936) 
1927 — Shanghai massacre  
1927 — Nanchang Uprising
1927 — Autumn Harvest Uprising
1927 — Guangzhou Uprising
1930–31 — First Encirclement Campaign
1931 — Second Encirclement Campaign
1931 — Third Encirclement Campaign
1932 — Fourth Encirclement Campaign
1933–34 — Fifth Encirclement Campaign
1934–1936 — Long March
1935 — Battles at Luding Bridge

Second Sino-Japanese War (1931-1945, part of World War II from 1941)

Ili Rebellion (1944–1949)
1946–1948 — Battle of Baitag Bogd (Pei-ta-shan Incident)

Chinese Civil War (Second phase, 1945–1949) 
Conflicts in the Chinese Civil War in the post-World War II era are listed chronologically by the starting dates.

1945
July 21, 1945 – August 8, 1945 — Yetaishan Campaign
August 13, 1945 – August 19, 1945 — Southern Jiangsu Campaign
August 13, 1945 – August 16, 1945 — Counteroffensive in Eastern Hubei
August 15, 1945 – August 23, 1945 — Battle of Baoying
August 16, 1945 – August 19, 1945 — Battle of Yongjiazhen
August 17, 1945 – August 27, 1945 — Battle of Tianmen
August 17, 1945 – August 25, 1945 — Pingyu Campaign
August 17, 1945 – September 11, 1945 — Linyi Campaign
August 24, 1945 – August 24, 1945 — Battle of Wuhe
August 26, 1945 – August 27, 1945 — Battle of Yinji
August 26, 1945 – September 22, 1945 — Huaiyin–Huai'an Campaign
August 29, 1945 – September 1, 1945 — Xinghua Campaign
September 1, 1945 – September 13, 1945 — Battle of Dazhongji
September 4, 1945 – September 5, 1945 — Battle of Lingbi
September 5, 1945 – September 8, 1945 — Zhucheng Campaign
September 5, 1945 – September 22, 1945 — Shanghe Campaign
September 6, 1945 – September 9, 1945 — Battle of Lishi
September 7, 1945 – September 10, 1945 — Pingdu Campaign
September 8, 1945 – September 12, 1945 — Taixing Campaign
September 10, 1945 – October 12, 1945 — Shangdang Campaign
September 13, 1945 – September 17, 1945 — Wudi Campaign
September 18, 1945 – September 18, 1945 — Battle of Xiangshuikou
September 21, 1945 – September 21, 1945 — Battle of Rugao
September 29, 1945 – November 2, 1945 — Weixian–Guangling–Nuanquan Campaign
October, 1945 – October, 1945 — Battle of Shicun
October 3, 1945 – November 10, 1945 — Yancheng Campaign
October 17, 1945 – December 14, 1945 — Tongbai Campaign
October 18, 1945 – October 18, 1945 — Battle of Houmajia
October 22, 1945 – November 2, 1945 — Handan Campaign
October 25, 1945 – November 16, 1945 — Battle of Shanhai Pass
October 26, 1945 – October 30, 1945 — Campaign Along the Datong–Puzhou Railway
November, 1945 – April, 1947 — Campaign to Suppress Bandits in Northeast China
November 3, 1945 – November 4, 1945 — Battle of Jiehezhen
December 19, 1945 – December 21, 1945 — Battle of Shaobo
December 19, 1945 – December 26, 1945 — Gaoyou–Shaobo Campaign
December 21, 1945 – December 30, 1945 — Battle of Tangtou–Guocun

1946
January 19, 1946 – January 26, 1946 — Houma Campaign
March 15, 1946 – March 17, 1946 — Battle of Siping
April 10, 1946 – April 15, 1946 — Jinjiatun Campaign
April 17, 1946 – May 19, 1946 — Campaign to Defend Siping
June 22, 1946 – August 31, 1946 — Campaign of the North China Plain Pocket
June 12, 1946 – September 1, 1946 — Campaign along the Southern Section of Datong–Puzhou Railway
July 31, 1946 – September 16, 1946 — Datong–Jining Campaign
August 10, 1946 – August 22, 1946 — Longhai Campaign
August 14, 1946 – September 1, 1946 — Datong–Puzhou Campaign
August 21, 1946 – September 22, 1946 — Battle of Huaiyin–Huai'an
August 25, 1946 – August, 1946 — Battle of Rugao–Huangqiao
September 2, 1946 – September 8, 1946 — Dingtao Campaign
September 22, 1946 – September 24, 1946 — Linfen–Fushan Campaign
October 10, 1946 – October 20, 1946 — Battle of Kalgan
November 10, 1946 – November 11, 1946 — Battle of Nanluo–Beiluo
November 22, 1946 – January 1, 1947 — Lüliang Campaign
December 17, 1946 – April 1, 1947 — Linjiang Campaign
December 31, 1946 – January 30, 1947 — Battle of Guanzhong
Pei-ta-shan Incident

1947
January 21, 1947 – January 28, 1947 — Campaign to the South of Baoding
April 24, 1947 – April 25, 1947 — Battle of Niangziguan
April 27, 1947 – April 28, 1947 — Battle of Tang'erli
May 13, 1947 – May 16, 1947 — Menglianggu Campaign
May 13, 1947 – July 1, 1947 — Summer Offensive of 1947 in Northeast China
May 28, 1947 – May 31, 1947 — Heshui Campaign
June 11, 1947 – March 13, 1948 — Siping Campaign
June 26, 1947 – July 6, 1947 — Campaign to the North of Baoding
July 17, 1947 – July 29, 1947 — Nanma–Linqu Campaign
August 13, 1947 – August 18, 1947 — Meridian Ridge Campaign
September 2, 1947 – September 12, 1947 — Campaign to the North of Daqing River
September 14, 1947 – November 5, 1947 — Autumn Offensive of 1947 in Northeast China
October 2, 1947 – October 10, 1947 — Sahe Mountain Campaign
October 29, 1947 – November 25, 1947 — Campaign in the Eastern Foothills of the Funiu Mountains
December 15, 1947 – March 15, 1948 — Winter Offensive of 1947 in Northeast China
December 7, 1947 – December 9, 1947 — Battle of Phoenix Peak
December 9, 1947 – June 15, 1948 — Western Tai'an Campaign
December 11, 1947 – January, 1948 — Counter-Eradication Campaign in Dabieshan
December 20, 1947 – June 1948 — Jingshan–Zhongxiang Campaign

1948
January 2, 1948 – January 7, 1948 — Gongzhutun Campaign
March 7, 1948 – May 18, 1948 — Linfen Campaign
March 11, 1948 – March 21, 1948 — Zhoucun–Zhangdian Campaign
May 12, 1948 – June 25, 1948 — Hebei–Rehe–Chahar Campaign
May 23, 1948 – October 19, 1948 — Siege of Changchun
May 29, 1948 – July 18, 1948 — Yanzhou Campaign
June 17, 1948 – June 19, 1948 — Battle of Shangcai
September 12, 1948 – November 12, 1948 — Liaoshen Campaign
October 5, 1948 – April 24, 1949 — Taiyuan Campaign
October 7, 1948 – October 15, 1948 — Battle of Jinzhou
October 10, 1948 – October 15, 1948 — Battle of Tashan
November 6, 1948 – January 10, 1949 — Huaihai Campaign
November 15, 1948 – January 11, 1949 — Battle of Jiulianshan
November 22, 1948 – December 15, 1948 — Shuangduiji Campaign
November 29, 1948 – January 31, 1949 — Pingjin Campaign
Pei-ta-shan Incident

1949
January 3, 1949 – January 15, 1949 — Tianjin Campaign
April, 1949 – June, 1950 — Campaign to Suppress Bandits in Northern China
April, 1949 – June, 1953 — Campaign to Suppress Bandits in Central and Southern China
May 12, 1949 – June 2, 1949 — Shanghai Campaign
May 17, 1949 – June 16, 1949 — Xianyang Campaign
August 9, 1949 – August 27, 1949 — Lanzhou Campaign
August 9, 1949 – December, 1953 — Campaign to Suppress Bandits in Eastern China
August 24, 1949 – September, 1951 — Campaign to Suppress Bandits in Fujian
September 5, 1949 – September 24, 1949 — Ningxia Campaign
September 5, 1949 – March, 1950 — Campaign to Suppress Bandits in Dabieshan
October 25, 1949 – October 27, 1949 — Battle of Guningtou
November, 1949 – July, 1953 — Campaign to Suppress Bandits in Northwestern China
November 1, 1949 – November 28, 1949 — Campaign to the North of Nanchuan County
November 3, 1949 – November 5, 1949 — Battle of Dengbu Island
November 17. 1949 – December 1, 1949 — Bobai Campaign
December 3, 1949 – December 26, 1949 — Campaign to Suppress Bandits in Lianyang
December 6, 1949 – December 7, 1949 — Battle of Liangjiashui
December 7, 1949 – December 14, 1949 — Battle of Lianyang
December 17, 1949 – December 18, 1949 — Battle of Jianmenguan

1950
January, 1950 – June, 1955 — Campaign to Suppress Bandits in Wuping
January 15, 1950 – May 1951 — Campaign to Suppress Bandits in Guangxi
January 19, 1950 – January 31, 1950 — Battle of Bamianshan
February, 1950 – December 1953 — Campaign to Suppress Bandits in Southwestern China
February 4, 1950 – December, 1950 — Campaign to Suppress Bandits in Longquan
February 14, 1950 – February 20, 1950 — Battle of Tianquan
March 3, 1950 – March 3, 1950 — Battle of Nan'ao Island
March 5, 1950 – May 1, 1950 — Landing Operation on Hainan Island
March 29, 1950 – May 7, 1950 — Battle of Yiwu
May 11, 1950 – May 11, 1950 — Battle of Dongshan Island
May 25, 1950 – August 7, 1950 — Wanshan Archipelago Campaign
August 9, 1950 – August 9, 1950 — Battle of Nanpéng Island
September, 1950 – January, 1951 — Campaign to Suppress Bandits in Northern Guangdong
September 22, 1950 – November 29, 1950 — Campaign to Suppress Bandits in northeastern Guizhou
October 15, 1950 – November, 1950 — Campaign to Suppress Bandits in the Border Region of Hunan–Hubei–Sichuan
October 15, 1950 – December, 1950 — Campaign to Suppress Bandits in Western Hunan
December 13, 1950 – February, 1951 — Campaign to Suppress Bandits in Shiwandashan
December 20, 1950 – February, 1951 — Campaign to Suppress Bandits in Liuwandashan

1951
January 8, 1951 – February, 1951 — Campaign to Suppress Bandits in Yaoshan
April 15, 1951 – September, 1951, — Campaign to Suppress Bandits in Western Guangxi

1952
April 11, 1952 – April 15, 1952 — Battle of Nanri Island
June 13, 1952 – September 20, 1952 — Campaign to Suppress Bandits in Heishui
September 20, 1952 – October 20, 1952 — Battle of Nanpēng Archipelago

1953
May 29, 1953 – May 29, 1953 — Battle of Dalushan Islands
July 16, 1953 – July 18, 1953 — Dongshan Island Campaign

1955
January 18, 1955 – January 20, 1955 — Battle of Yijiangshan Islands
January 19, 1955 – February 26, 1955 — Battle of Dachen Archipelago

1960
November 14, 1960 – February 9, 1961 — Campaign at the China-Burma Border

1950–1958
Kuomintang Islamic insurgency

Annexation of Tibet (1950)
Battle of Chamdo (1950)
Lhasa Uprising (1959)

Korean War (1950–1953)

Sino-Indian War (1962)
The Sino-Indian War between China and India occurred in October–November 1962. A disputed Himalayan border was the main cause of the war. There had been a series of violent border skirmishes between the two countries after the 1959 Tibetan uprising, when India granted asylum to the Dalai Lama. India initiated a defensive Forward Policy from 1960 to hinder Chinese military patrols and logistics, in which it placed outposts along the border, including several north of the McMahon Line, the eastern portion of the Line of Actual Control proclaimed by Chinese Premier Zhou Enlai in 1959.

Nathu La and Cho La clashes (1967)

Sino-Soviet border conflict (1969)
1969 – Zhenbao Island

Vietnam War (1964-1975)
1974 - Paracel Islands

Sino-Vietnamese War (1979)
1974 – Battle of the Paracel Islands

1979 – Battle of Lạng Sơn
1979 – Battle of Lao Cai
1979 – Battle of Cam Duong
1979 – Battle of Cao Bang

Sino-Vietnamese conflicts (1979–1991)
1981 – Battle of Fakashan
1984 – Battle of Laoshan
1988 – Johnson South Reef Skirmish

2020–2022 China–India skirmishes

Mali War

See also
 List of wars involving the People's Republic of China
 List of wars involving the Republic of China
 List of wars involving Taiwan

Notes

Further reading
 Graff, David Andrew, and Robin Higham, eds. A military history of China (University Press of Kentucky, 2012).
 Li, Xiaobing, ed. China at War: An Encyclopedia. Santa Barbara: ABC-CLIO, 2012. online
 Liu, Frederick Fu. A Military History of Modern China, 1924-1949 (1972).
 Mitter, Rana. "Old ghosts, new memories: China's changing war history in the era of post-Mao politics." Journal of Contemporary History 38.1 (2003): 117–131.
 Ryan, Mark A., David Michael Finkelstein, and Michael A. McDevitt. Chinese Warfighting: the PLA experience since 1949 (ME Sharpe, 2003).
 Swope, Kenneth, ed. Warfare in China since 1600 (Routledge, 2017).
 Worthing, Peter M. A military historyof modern China: from the manchu conquest to Tian'anmen Square (Praeger, 2007).
 Wortzel, Larry M., and Robin Higham. Dictionary of contemporary Chinese military history (Abc-clio, 1999).

External links
 Power Polarity In The Far Eastern World System, 1025 BC-AD 1850: Narrative And 25-Year Interval Data by David Wilkinson

 

China
Chinese battles
Chinese battles
Battles
Wars and battles
Wars